Graeme Hunter Kelling (4 April 1957 – 10 June 2004) was a Scottish musician and the original guitarist with the Scottish pop band Deacon Blue.

Born in Paisley, Scotland, Kelling was brought up in Mount Vernon in the East End of Glasgow and educated at the High School of Glasgow. Born into the Plymouth Brethren sect, he turned away from it in order to travel and to follow music. In the early 1980s he worked in the Glasgow rock music scene as both bandmember (Tune Cookies, On a Clear Day, Precious, and The Painted Word) and session guitarist. Having joined Deacon Blue in 1984 (while the band was still called "Dr Love"), Kelling went on to co-write their 1987 single "Loaded" and the B-side "Ronnie Spector" (the latter from the second single release of "Dignity"). He played on the first four Deacon Blue albums – Raintown, When the World Knows Your Name, Fellow Hoodlums and Whatever You Say, Say Nothing – before the band's first split in 1994.
  
Following the end of his first stint with Deacon Blue, Kelling ran a recording studio and wrote soundtrack and incidental music for film and television. He also took on work as a prose writer, contributing restaurant reviews to The List and travel writing to Peter Irvine's guide book Scotland the Best. Kelling rejoined Deacon Blue in May 1999, and despite being diagnosed with pancreatic cancer early in 2000, continued working with the band for the next five years (contributing to the albums Walking Back Home and Homesick).

Kelling died in 2004 in Glasgow at the age of 47. He was survived by his wife (television producer Julie Smith) and two children, Alexander and Grace.

References

External links

 Gazetteer for Scotland biography
 BBC obituary
 Obituary at the Daily Record

1957 births
2004 deaths
Musicians from Paisley, Renfrewshire
Deaths from pancreatic cancer
Scottish male guitarists
Deaths from cancer in Scotland
Scottish pop guitarists
People educated at the High School of Glasgow
Scottish rock guitarists
Lead guitarists
Deacon Blue members
20th-century British guitarists
20th-century British male musicians